The Human Fly is the name of three fictional characters appearing in American comic books published by Marvel Comics. One is a supervillain that was an occasional antagonist of Spider-Man, and the other two were superheroes, one of which was the title of a short-lived series in the late 1950s reprinting some of Fox's Blue Beetle strips from the 1940s. It was published by Super Comics.

Publication history
The Human Fly first appeared in The Amazing Spider-Man Annual #10 (January 1976), and was created by Len Wein, Bill Mantlo, and Gil Kane. The character subsequently appears in The Amazing Spider-Man #192–193 (May–June 1979), Spider-Woman #30 (September 1980), Moon Knight #35 (January 1984), Peter Parker, the Spectacular Spider-Man #86 (January 1984), and The Amazing Spider-Man #276 (May 1986), in which he was killed by the Scourge of the Underworld. The story of the Fly in Peter Parker, the Spectacular Spider-Man #86 was drawn by Fred Hembeck, who (in his personal caricature form) had a guest appearance in that particular issue. The Fly received an entry in the original The Official Handbook of the Marvel Universe #4, and The Official Handbook of the Marvel Universe: Spider-Man #1 (2005).

The superhero version of Human Fly starred in Marvel Comics' The Human Fly #1–19 (September 1977 – March 1979).

Fictional character biography

Richard Deacon

Richard Deacon, born in Newark, New Jersey, was a small-time criminal who was shot by the police and left for dead after an unsuccessful kidnapping attempt which was foiled by Spider-Man. Stumbling into the laboratory of Dr. Harlan Stillwell (whose brother Farley Stillwell created the Scorpion for J. Jonah Jameson), Deacon coerces the scientist into saving his life. Overhearing an offer Jameson made with Stillwell to fund the creation of a new superhero, Deacon insists he be the subject of the experiment. Stillwell imprints the genetic coding of a housefly onto Deacon, empowering him and healing him of his bullet wounds. Deacon then kills Harlan Stillwell after he served his purpose and uses his newfound powers to further his criminal ambitions. He first uses Jameson as bait to get revenge on Spider-Man. Due to his inexperience, the Fly is no match for him and is defeated.

Some time later, Human Fly begins to display fly-like tendencies like eating garbage. He also develops physical mutations, including facet eyes. Human Fly attacks Spider-Man after Spencer Smythe handcuffed him—along with Jameson—to a bomb. Human Fly hurls the two from a rooftop and leaves them for dead. Once freed from the shackle, Spider-Man tries to stop Human Fly from stealing an art exhibit, but the villain knocks him down and escapes. Soon afterwards, the police catch the Fly using S.H.I.E.L.D. equipment.

Traveling to Los Angeles, the Fly seeks out Dr. Karl Malus, who confirms that his powers are fading and he will soon be powerless. Malus recommends that he get a new set of powers using a blood transfusion from another superbeing, which would most conveniently be the locally operating Spider-Woman. With his powers already at less than a third their usual strength however, he is unable to defeat her and is apprehended. Afterwards, Malus uses some of Human Fly's DNA to temporarily mutate Scotty McDowell into the similarly powered Hornet.

Human Fly is freed from prison and his powers restored by untold means. He subsequently battles Moon Knight, leaving the hero temporarily paralyzed, and again seeks revenge against Jameson and Spider-Man. Partnered with the Black Cat, Spider-Man once more defeats the Fly.

Over time, Deacon's mutation increases. After escaping from a mental institution, Deacon is killed by a Scourge of the Underworld (who was disguised as a garbage man) while trying to take revenge on Spider-Man.

During the "Dark Reign" storyline, the Human Fly is among the eighteen criminals that were murdered by Scourge of the Underworld to be resurrected by Hood using the power of Dormammu as part of a squad assembled to eliminate the Punisher. He now has acidic vomit that can melt steel and wings strong enough to deflect cannon fire and sharp enough to cut a dump truck in two. The Fly, now craving human flesh, devours a prostitute in a private room, and then fights a group of armed guards who burst in, vomiting deadly acid on them. When he assaults another woman in the hallway, the Punisher confronts him. Punisher uses his knife to cut one of Human Fly's wings in half. A group of his fellow criminals (disguised as Avengers from another time and place) intervene as Bird-Man manages to get Human Fly to safety. His wing regenerates rather quickly. He battles the Punisher again with Letha and Lascivious, and is defeated when the Punisher throws him into Lascivious.

Human Fly is apprehended by Agent Venom, but he is able to escape a prisoner transport to the Raft when the Hobgoblin attacks the transport trying to kill the Human Fly for stealing money from the Kingpin. Human Fly is later recruited by the third Crime Master to become a member of his Savage Six.

He is then hired by Boomerang and Owl to become a member of the Sinister Sixteen.

During the "Hunted" storyline, Human Fly is among the animal-themed characters that were captured by Taskmaster and Black Ant for Kraven the Hunter's Great Hunt which is sponsored by Arcade's company Arcade Industries. He was seen at a gathering held by Vulture. When the Great Hunt was over, Human Fly was present when Razorback, Toad, White Rabbit, and Yellowjacket planned to take revenge on Black Ant only for Taskmaster to make off with Black Ant.

Human Fly (superhero)

The second Human Fly was a young man of unknown identity who was severely injured during a car crash. After a long hospitalization, including a number of reconstructive surgeries in which much of his skeleton was replaced by steel, he took on the masked identity of the Human Fly. As the Human Fly, he performed daredevil stunts to benefit various charities, especially those helping children with disabilities.

His activities often drew him into conflict with criminals, who were often seeking to rob the charity events at which he performed. Additionally, he drew the attention of Spider-Man, who thought he might be the villain of the same name.

The character was based on real-life stuntman Rick Rojatt. The comic book carried the tag line "The Wildest Super-Hero Ever – Because He's Real!", and photographs of someone in a Human Fly costume appeared in the books. Jim Shooter, a high-ranking member of Marvel's editorial staff at the time of publication, said in 2007 that the photos were indeed of Rojatt.

Powers and abilities
The Richard Deacon version of Human Fly has inhuman physical attributes, winged flight, and surface scaling. His compound eyes enable him to see in all directions at once. By vibrating his wings, he can create powerful shockwaves with concussive force. Following his revival at the Hood's hands, Deacon is able to vomit acid capable of dissolving flesh or metal, as well as wings that are regenerative and bladed.

The superhero version of Human Fly had his bone structure replaced by 60% steel, which allows him to withstand any injury that normal humans cannot. He is a master aerialist, unarmed combatant, and stuntman. The Human Fly utilizes a variety of specialized gadgets that helps him in his performances, depending on the stunt.

Reception
 In 2020, CBR.com ranked Human Fly 9th in their "Spider-Man: 10 Weirdest Animal Villains From The Comics That We'd Like To See In The MCU" list.

In other media

Television
 In the Spider-Woman episode "Spider-Woman and the Fly", a crazed scientist named Dr. Hagel became a giant fly. The Fly was able to find out Spider-Woman's alter-ego. However, when he was turned back to normal, he forgot everything about Spider-Woman's true identity.
 The super-villain Human Fly made a cameo appearance on the Spider-Man and His Amazing Friends episode "Attack of the Arachnoid". He was seen as an inmate in Ryker's Island with Electro, Klaw, and Blastaar.

References

External links
 
 
 A satirical discussion of Marvel's series on the Human Fly/Rick Rojatt

Articles about multiple fictional characters
Characters created by Bill Mantlo
Characters created by Gil Kane
Characters created by Len Wein
Comics characters introduced in 1976
Comics characters introduced in 1977
Fictional cannibals
Fictional flies
Fictional stunt performers
Fictional characters from New Jersey
Fictional characters with superhuman durability or invulnerability
Marvel Comics characters with superhuman strength
Marvel Comics hybrids
Marvel Comics male superheroes
Marvel Comics male supervillains
Marvel Comics mutates
Marvel Comics superheroes
Marvel Comics supervillains
Marvel Comics titles
Spider-Man characters